Kid Krrish is an Indian film series of animated television films produced by Toonz Animation, Film Kraft Productions and Turner International India. The first film of the series, Kid Krrish was released on 2 October 2013 and the film is part of Kid Krrish film series, which itself is part of Krrish franchise, with its three sequels: Kid Krrish: Mission Bhutan, Kid Krrish: Mystery in Mongolia and Kid Krrish: Shakalaka Africa.

Kid Krrish was planned as the first movie in the four part series of Kid Krrish films as a part of Krrish franchise.

Movies 
 Kid Krrish	
 Kid Krrish: Mission Bhutan 	
 Kid Krrish: Mystery in Mongolia
 Kid Krrish: Shakalaka Africa

References 

Krrish
2013 television films
2013 films
Indian animated films
Indian television films
Cartoon Network (Indian TV channel)
2010s Indian superhero films
Cartoon Network television films
Indian animated speculative fiction films
Indian superhero films